Precipitation is any meteorological phenomenon featuring water falling from the clouds, such as rain, snow, or hail.

Precipitation may also refer to:
 Alkaline precipitation, meteorological precipitation characterized by high alkalinity
 Precipitation (chemistry), condensation of a solid from a solution during a chemical reaction:
 Ammonium sulfate precipitation, a method of purifying proteins
 Precipitation hardening, a method used to strengthen malleable materials
 Protein precipitation, a method of separating contaminants from biological products
 For precipitation resulting from the denaturation of proteins, see coagulation
 Ethanol precipitation, a method of concentrating DNA
 Precipitation (horse), a racehorse
 Electron precipitation, an atmospheric phenomenon that occurs when previously trapped electrons enter the Earth's atmosphere

See also
 Coprecipitation
 Quantitative precipitation forecast
 Precipitate (disambiguation)